Dutch John Mountain may refer to:
Dutch John Mountain (Nevada), along the Great Basin Highway
Dutch John Mountain (Utah), near Daggett, Utah